Acalanes Ridge is a census-designated place in Contra Costa County, California. The population was 1,285 at the 2020 Census.

Acalanes Ridge was created a census-designated place for the 2010 census, and comes alphabetically first among all census-designated places in California.

History

Acalanes Ridge is named after the area's historical Native American residents, the Sacalanes.

Demographics

The 2010 United States Census reported that Acalanes Ridge had a population of 1,137. The racial makeup of Acalanes Ridge was 951 (83.6%) White, 5 (0.4%) African American, 8 (0.7%) Native American, 126 (11.1%) Asian, 2 (0.2%) Pacific Islander, 8 (0.7%) from other races, and 37 (3.3%) from two or more races. Hispanic or Latino of any race were 50 persons (4.4%).

The Census reported that 100% of the population lived in households.

There were 441 households, out of which 143 (32.4%) had children under the age of 18 living in them, 293 (66.4%) were opposite-sex married couples living together, 28 (6.3%) had a female householder with no husband present, 10 (2.3%) had a male householder with no wife present.  There were 15 (3.4%) unmarried opposite-sex partnerships, and 6 (1.4%) same-sex married couples or partnerships. 89 households (20.2%) were made up of individuals, and 39 (8.8%) had someone living alone who was 65 years of age or older. The average household size was 2.58.  There were 331 families (75.1% of all households); the average family size was 2.93.

The population was spread out, with 265 people (23.3%) under the age of 18, 45 people (4.0%) aged 18 to 24, 232 people (20.4%) aged 25 to 44, 411 people (36.1%) aged 45 to 64, and 184 people (16.2%) who were 65 years of age or older.  The median age was 46.3 years. For every 100 females, there were 94.7 males.  For every 100 females age 18 and over, there were 94.2 males.

The homeowner vacancy rate was 0.3%; the rental vacancy rate was 7.5%.  1,023 people (90.0% of the population) lived in owner-occupied housing units and 114 people (10.0%) lived in rental housing units.

Education
Most of Acalanes Ridge is in the Walnut Creek Elementary School District while some is in the Lafayette Elementary School District. All of Acalanes Ridge is in the Acalanes Union High School District.

References

Census-designated places in Contra Costa County, California
Census-designated places in California